Nemeritis elegans is a species of ichneumon wasps found in Europe.

References 

 Nemeritis elegans at fauna-eu.org

Campopleginae
Insects described in 1901